The  is a French competitive examination for the recruitment of associate professors who teach history or geography at the , or  level.

History 
The  was created in 1831.

Structure of the examinations 

 Qualifying examinations (written):

Each of the history written tests must deal with a different historical period. These two essays are given in chronological order: if medieval history, for example, is the subject of the first essay, the second essay will automatically deal with the question on modern history or contemporary history (but not ancient history, which may be given as a commentary).

 Practical and oral exams:

Programme questions 
In history, two out of four of the questions are renewed each year, with each question remaining on the curriculum for two years. In geography, one question on France is included every year, while the other question changes. Since 2008, the question on France has been topical.

2022 Programme 
History questions:

 (new question) ancient: The Greek world and the East from 404 to 200 BC;
 (new question) medieval: Cities and state building in North-Western Europe from the 13th to the 15th century (Empire, former Netherlands, France, England);
 modern: The world of print in Western Europe (ca. 1470 - ca. 1680);
 Contemporary: Labour in Western Europe from the 1830s to the 1930s. Craft and industrial labour, practices and social issues.

Geography questions:

 Thematic geography: Borders;
 (new question) Geography of territories: Populations, settlement and territories in France.

2021 Programme 
History questions:

 Ancient: Religion and power in the Roman world from 218 BCE to 235 CE
 Medieval: Writing, power and society in the West from the beginning of the 12th century to the end of the 14th century (England, France, Italian Peninsula, Iberian Peninsula)
 (new question) modern: The world of print in Western Europe (ca. 1470 - ca. 1680)
 (new question) contemporary: Labour in Western Europe from the 1830s to the 1930s. Craft and industrial labour, practices and social issues

Geography questions:

    Geography of territories: Rural areas in France
    (new question) Thematic geography: Borders

The subjects for 2021 were: medieval history: 'Stability and precariousness of the written word', contemporary history: 'Being a worker', explanation of texts in modern history: '' by Antoine Vitré (159?-1674) and geography of territories: ''.

The 2021 session was affected by the Covid-19 pandemic due to mandatory distancing and wearing of masks within examination centres by all candidates, during written and oral tests. Oral admission tests were not attended by the public for the 2021 session. 150 candidates were eligible.

2020 Programme 
This session was notable for the absence of oral tests due to the Covid-19 pandemic. The written eligibility tests were considered valid as admission tests. They were organised from 22 to 25 June 2020 instead of March.

History questions

    (new question) Ancient: Religion and power in the Roman world from 218 BCE to 235 CE;
    (new question) medieval: Writing, power and society in the West from the early 12th to the late 14th century (England, France, Italian peninsula, Iberian peninsula);
    modern: State, powers and disputes in the French and British monarchies and their American colonies (ca. 1640 - ca. 1780);
    contemporary: Culture, media, powers in the United States and Western Europe 1945 - 1991.

Geography questions:

    (new question) thematic geography: South-East Asia;
    Geography of territories: Rural areas in France

The 2020 topics are: Ancient History composition: "Piety and Impiety in Public Religion"., contemporary history composition: "the 1968s: culture and protest" interpretation of medieval history texts: "The books of a Dominican friar in the 13th century on 17 June 1287" and composition of the geography of territories: "Natural risks and territories in South-East Asia".

Success rates 

Between 2003 and 2009, the number of successful candidates decreased by 30%, without offsetting the decrease in the number of posts (-37% over the period).

The success rate varies greatly from one academy to another. It is exceptionally high in the academies of Créteil-Paris-Versailles and Lyon because of the presence of the École Normale Supérieure of rue d'Ulm, Lyon, Cachan (students from the latter benefiting from the preparation offered by rue d'Ulm), the École des Chartes, and renowned faculties such as Paris-I and Paris-IV.

Historians' views on the agrégation d'histoire 

In 1883, Ernest Lavisse, speaking to Parisian students, said:

"The  will not require of those of you who choose the history of antiquity the slightest notion of epigraphy or archaeology; nor will it require of those who choose the history of the Middle Ages the slightest notion of palaeography or diplomacy or medieval philology [...] and all that you will not be asked for will be indispensable."

Controversy at the 2011 session 
The two historians behind the subject, Catherine Vincent and Denyse Riche, resigned from the jury after their error was revealed by the French media. The Ministry of Education officially took a position by announcing that this error, although not in line with the required scientific rigour, did not lead to the cancellation of the test since the principle of equality between candidates had not been violated.

Famous winners 
Famous recipients of the agrégation in history-geography and later in history include:

References

Bibliography 
André Chervel (1993). . Paris: Kimé. p. 289.

Jean-François Condette (2015).  127 (2): 219-238.
Loukia Efthymiou (2003). . Clio. 18: 91-112.
Nicolas Ginsburger, "Historians and Geographers in the Vichy Scalpel".
Yves Verneuil (2005). . Paris: Belin. p. 367.

External links 

 [http://eduscol.education.fr/fileadmin/user_upload/histoire_geo/PDF/agregation_externe_histoire.pdf 
 [http://www.education.gouv.fr/cid28809/menh0914011n.html 
 [http://media.education.gouv.fr/file/agregation_ext/40/1/histoire_125401.pdf 

Education in France
French Civil Service
Recruitment